The Battle of Constantinople was a Gothic attack on Constantinople in 378 following the Gothic victory at the Battle of Adrianople. The emperor Valens's widow prepared the defence, and also reinforced the city with Arab warriors, who performed excellently in combat. It is said that the Goths were impressed when one of the Arab warriors stormed out of the city naked, slaughtered enemies, and drank blood from the neck of a decapitated Goth. Other sources maintain that the Goths actually abandoned the attack because they were greatly outnumbered.

In the end, Goths did not enter the city and retreated to Thrace, Illyria, and Dacia.

References

378
Constantinople 378
Constantinople 378
Constantinople 378
Sieges of Constantinople
370s in the Roman Empire